The following is an alphabetical list of articles related to the U.S. state of South Carolina.

0–9 

.sc.us – Internet second-level domain for the state of South Carolina
8th state to ratify the Constitution of the United States of America

A
Adjacent states:

Agriculture in South Carolina
Airports in South Carolina
Amusement parks in South Carolina
Appalachia
Aquaria in South Carolina
commons:Category:Aquaria in South Carolina
Arboreta in South Carolina
commons:Category:Arboreta in South Carolina
Archaeology in South Carolina
:Category:Archaeological sites in South Carolina
commons:Category:Archaeological sites in South Carolina
Architecture in South Carolina
Art museums and galleries in South Carolina
commons:Category:Art museums and galleries in South Carolina
Astronomical observatories in South Carolina
commons:Category:Astronomical observatories in South Carolina

B
Beaches in South Carolina
Botanical gardens in South Carolina
commons:Category:Botanical gardens in South Carolina
Buildings and structures in South Carolina
commons:Category:Buildings and structures in South Carolina

C

Capital of the State of South Carolina
Capitol of the State of South Carolina
commons:Category:South Carolina State Capitol
Census statistical areas of South Carolina
Charlestown, capital of the Province of Carolina 1670–1712, the Province of South Carolina 1712–1776, and the State of South Carolina 1776-1786
Cities in South Carolina
commons:Category:Cities in South Carolina
Climate of South Carolina
:Category:Climate of South Carolina
commons:Category:Climate of South Carolina
Colleges and universities in South Carolina
commons:Category:Universities and colleges in South Carolina
Columbia, South Carolina, state capital since 1786
Communications in South Carolina
Companies in South Carolina
Congressional districts of South Carolina
Constitution of the State of South Carolina
Convention centers in South Carolina
commons:Category:Convention centers in South Carolina
Counties of the state of South Carolina
commons:Category:Counties in South Carolina
Culture of South Carolina
commons:Category:South Carolina culture

D
Demographics of South Carolina

E
Economy of South Carolina
:Category:Economy of South Carolina
commons:Category:Economy of South Carolina
Education in South Carolina
:Category:Education in South Carolina
commons:Category:Education in South Carolina
Elections in the state of South Carolina
:Category:South Carolina elections
commons:Category:South Carolina elections
Environment of South Carolina
commons:Category:Environment of South Carolina

F

Festivals in South Carolina
commons:Category:Festivals in South Carolina
Flag of the State of South Carolina
Forts in South Carolina
:Category:Forts in South Carolina
commons:Category:Forts in South Carolina

G

Geography of South Carolina
:Category:Geography of South Carolina
commons:Category:Geography of South Carolina
Geology of South Carolina
commons:Category:Geology of South Carolina
Ghost towns in South Carolina
:Category:Ghost towns in South Carolina
commons:Category:Ghost towns in South Carolina
Golf clubs and courses in South Carolina
Government of the State of South Carolina  website
:Category:Government of South Carolina
commons:Category:Government of South Carolina
Governor of the State of South Carolina
List of governors of South Carolina
Great Seal of the State of South Carolina

H
High schools of South Carolina
Higher education in South Carolina
Highway routes in South Carolina
Hiking trails in South Carolina
commons:Category:Hiking trails in South Carolina
History of South Carolina
Indigenous peoples
Spanish colony of la Florida, 1565–1763
English Province of Carolina, 1663–1707
History of slavery in South Carolina
French colony of la Louisiane, 1699–1763
British Province of Carolina, 1707–1712
British Province of South Carolina, 1712–1776
French and Indian War, 1754–1763
Treaty of Fontainebleau of 1762
Treaty of Paris of 1763
British Indian Reserve, 1763–1783
Royal Proclamation of 1763
American Revolutionary War, 1775–1783
United States Declaration of Independence of 1776
Treaty of Paris of 1783
State of South Carolina, since 1776
Cherokee–American wars, 1776–1794
Western territorial claims ceded 1787
War of 1812, 1812–1815
South Carolina in the American Civil War, 1860–1865
Confederate States of America, 1861–1865
Battle of Fort Sumter, 1861
South Carolina in Reconstruction, 1865–1868
:Category:History of South Carolina
commons:Category:History of South Carolina
Hospitals in South Carolina
House of Representatives of the State of South Carolina

I
Images of South Carolina
commons:Category:South Carolina
Islands of South Carolina

J

K

L
Lakes of South Carolina
commons:Category:Lakes of South Carolina
Landmarks in South Carolina
commons:Category:Landmarks in South Carolina
Lieutenant Governor of the State of South Carolina
Lists related to the State of South Carolina:
List of African American Historic Places in South Carolina
List of airports in South Carolina
List of beaches in South Carolina
List of census statistical areas in South Carolina
List of cities in South Carolina
List of colleges and universities in South Carolina
List of counties in South Carolina
List of forts in South Carolina
List of ghost towns in South Carolina
List of governors of South Carolina
List of high schools in South Carolina
List of highway routes in South Carolina
List of hospitals in South Carolina
List of islands of South Carolina
List of lieutenant governors of South Carolina
List of metropolitan areas of South Carolina
List of museums in South Carolina
List of National Historic Landmarks in South Carolina
List of newspapers in South Carolina
List of people from South Carolina
List of radio stations in South Carolina
List of railroads in South Carolina
List of Registered Historic Places in South Carolina
List of rivers of South Carolina
List of school districts in South Carolina
List of state forests in South Carolina
List of state parks in South Carolina
List of state prisons in South Carolina
List of symbols of the State of South Carolina
List of South Carolina weather records
List of television stations in South Carolina
List of towns in South Carolina
List of United States congressional delegations from South Carolina
List of United States congressional districts in South Carolina
List of United States representatives from South Carolina
List of United States senators from South Carolina
List of villages in South Carolina

M
Maps of South Carolina
commons:Category:Maps of South Carolina
Mass media in South Carolina
Mountains of South Carolina
commons:Category:Mountains of South Carolina
Museums in South Carolina
:Category:Museums in South Carolina
commons:Category:Museums in South Carolina
Music of South Carolina
commons:Category:Music of South Carolina
:Category:Musical groups from South Carolina
:Category:Musicians from South Carolina

N
National Forests of South Carolina
commons:Category:National Forests of South Carolina
Natural history of South Carolina
commons:Category:Natural history of South Carolina
Newspapers of South Carolina

O
Outdoor sculptures in South Carolina
commons:Category:Outdoor sculptures in South Carolina

P
People from South Carolina
:Category:People from South Carolina
commons:Category:People from South Carolina
:Category:People by city in South Carolina
:Category:People by county in South Carolina
:Category:People from South Carolina by occupation
Politics of South Carolina
:Category:Politics of South Carolina
commons:Category:Politics of South Carolina
Protected areas of South Carolina
commons:Category:Protected areas of South Carolina

Q

R
Radio stations in South Carolina
Railroads in South Carolina
Registered historic places in South Carolina
commons:Category:Registered Historic Places in South Carolina
Religion in South Carolina
:Category:Religion in South Carolina
commons:Category:Religion in South Carolina
Rivers of South Carolina
commons:Category:Rivers of South Carolina
Roller coasters in South Carolina
commons:Category:Roller coasters in South Carolina

S
SC – United States Postal Service postal code for the State of South Carolina
School districts of South Carolina
Scouting in South Carolina
Settlements in South Carolina
Cities in South Carolina
Towns in South Carolina
List of Census Designated Places in South Carolina
Other unincorporated communities in South Carolina
List of ghost towns in South Carolina
Senate of the State of South Carolina
South Carolina  website
:Category:South Carolina
commons:Category:South Carolina
commons:Category:Maps of South Carolina
South Carolina Highway Patrol
South Carolina Department of Transportation
South Carolina State House
Sports in South Carolina
commons:Category:Sports in South Carolina
Sports venues in South Carolina
commons:Category:Sports venues in South Carolina
State of South Carolina  website
Constitution of the State of South Carolina
Government of the State of South Carolina
:Category:Government of South Carolina
commons:Category:Government of South Carolina
Executive branch of the government of the State of South Carolina
Governor of the State of South Carolina
Legislative branch of the government of the State of South Carolina
Legislature of the State of South Carolina
Senate of the State of South Carolina
House of Representatives of the State of South Carolina
Judicial branch of the government of the State of South Carolina
Supreme Court of the State of South Carolina
South Carolina Bar
State parks of South Carolina
commons:Category:State parks of South Carolina
State prisons of South Carolina
Structures in South Carolina
commons:Category:Buildings and structures in South Carolina
Supreme Court of the State of South Carolina
Symbols of the State of South Carolina
:Category:Symbols of South Carolina
commons:Category:Symbols of South Carolina

T
Telecommunications in South Carolina
commons:Category:Communications in South Carolina
Telephone area codes in South Carolina
Television shows set in South Carolina
Television stations in South Carolina
Tourism in South Carolina  website
commons:Category:Tourism in South Carolina
Towns in South Carolina
commons:Category:Cities in South Carolina
Transportation in South Carolina
:Category:Transportation in South Carolina
commons:Category:Transport in South Carolina

U
United States of America
States of the United States of America
United States census statistical areas of South Carolina
United States congressional delegations from South Carolina
United States congressional districts in South Carolina
United States Court of Appeals for the Fourth Circuit
United States District Court for the District of South Carolina
United States representatives from South Carolina
United States senators from South Carolina
Universities and colleges in South Carolina
commons:Category:Universities and colleges in South Carolina
US-SC – ISO 3166-2:US region code for the State of South Carolina

V
Vehicle registration plates of South Carolina
Villages in South Carolina

W
Waterfalls of South Carolina
commons:Category:Waterfalls of South Carolina
Wikimedia
Wikimedia Commons:Category:South Carolina
commons:Category:Maps of South Carolina
Wikinews:Category:South Carolina
Wikinews:Portal:South Carolina
Wikipedia Category:South Carolina
Wikipedia Portal:South Carolina
Wikipedia:WikiProject South Carolina
:Category:WikiProject South Carolina articles
:Category:WikiProject South Carolina participants

X

Y

Z
Zoos in South Carolina
commons:Category:Zoos in South Carolina

See also

Topic overview:
South Carolina
Outline of South Carolina

South Carolina
 
South Carolina